Agrarian means pertaining to agriculture, farmland, or rural areas.

Agrarian may refer to:

Political philosophy 
Agrarianism
Agrarian law, Roman laws regulating the division of the public lands
Agrarian reform
Agrarian socialism

Society 
Agrarian society
Agrarian system
Agrarian structure
 Agrarian technology

See also
Agrarian League (disambiguation)
Agrarian Party (disambiguation)
Agrarian Justice, 1797 pamphlet by Thomas Paine
Southern Agrarians
Agricultural economics
Agrarian change